Google One Pass was an online store developed by Google for publishers looking to sell subscriptions to their content. Similar to the Android Market, where "apps" are sold to users via their Android mobile devices, One Pass offered the ability for publishers of any size, from large media companies to independent publishers, to sell their content through Google's service. The content was made available through both the Internet and Android mobile devices.

Google announced the closure of One Pass on April 20, 2012.

History 

One Pass was officially announced on February 16, 2011 at Humboldt University in Berlin by Eric Schmidt.  Google One Pass became immediately available for publishers in Canada, France, Germany, Italy, Spain, the U.K. and the U.S.

Priced content/subscriptions 

Similar to the Android Market, Google shared in the revenue generated by all sales through One Pass.  On its launch date, revenue was split between the publisher and Google in a 90%/10% respectively.  That was significantly less than Apple's competing product that provided only 70% of the revenue to the publisher and kept the remaining 30%.

Publishers determined the payments models and had full control over the content they charged for and content they offered for free.  The system itself managed the user authentication, payment processing, administration and the distribution to any device that was browser enabled and/or had a native mobile app that could distribute the content.  The core idea was to allow the publishers to focus on what they do best and not worry about the hassle involved in building an online store.

Publishers also had access to all of a customer's information when the customer actually subscribed or purchased any content from the publisher. This may be part of the agreement the customer made when signing up to use One Pass.  In the Apple subscription system, publishers are only given user data if the user specifies that they can have it.

Availability for users
Users outside the countries/regions listed below only had access to free applications through Google One Pass. Paid content was available to Google One Pass users only in the following countries:

Availability for publishers 

Initially the service allowed publishers in any country where Google Checkout was available to distribute content through One Pass.

References

External links 
Blog
Washington Post article
One pass

One Pass